Pycnandra kaalaensis is a species of plant in the family Sapotaceae. It is endemic to New Caledonia.

References

Endemic flora of New Caledonia
kaalaensis
Vulnerable plants
Taxonomy articles created by Polbot
Taxa named by André Aubréville